Andrew Chidozie Robert Onyeama-Christie (born 22 March 1999) is a Scotland international rugby union player who plays for Saracens. 

Born and raised in England, he is Scottish qualified through descent, and was first selected for the Scottish national rugby team in January 2022, for the following Six Nations tournament. His first cap was gained as a replacement in the six nations match against France on 26 February 2022 at Murrayfield.

Personal life
Christie was born in England to a Nigerian father (Patrick Onyeama) and a British mother whose parents are Scottish (Victoria Christie).

References

External link
 
Saracens profile

1999 births
Rugby union players from Bristol
People educated at Bristol Grammar School
People educated at Harrow School
Living people
Black British sportsmen
Scottish rugby union players
English rugby union players
English people of Scottish descent
English people of Nigerian descent
Rugby union flankers
Rugby union number eights
Saracens F.C. players
Scotland international rugby union players